Munkh-Erdene Enkhtaivan (born 17 October 1995) is a Mongolian  association footballer who plays as a goalkeeper for Mongolian Premier League club FC Ulaanbaatar and the Mongolian national team. He made his first appearance for the Mongolia national football team in 2017.

Club career
He started his career with Athletic 220. While playing for them he was named the best goal keeper in the 2017, 2018  and 2021 league best XIs , and has played in the AFC Cup for them in 2021, and was listed by AFC as their key player in that season's competition as they played in group J. He played in the 2022 edition as well, but Athletic 220 were defeated by Lee Man of Hong Kong and failed to make the group stage.
After Athletic 220 withdrew from the Mongolian premier league, he signed for FC Ulaanbaatar in summer 2022 for an undisclosed fee.

References

External links
 

1995 births
Living people
Mongolian footballers
Mongolia international footballers
Association football goalkeepers
Athletic 220 players
Mongolian National Premier League players